Paradoxia is a genus of green algae, in the family Coccomyxaceae.

References

External links

Scientific references

Scientific databases
 AlgaTerra database
 Index Nominum Genericorum

Trebouxiophyceae genera
Trebouxiophyceae